London Boys were a German-based British dance-pop duo composed of Edem Ephraim (1 July 1959, London, UK – 21 January 1996) and Dennis Fuller (19 June 1959, Jamaica – 21 January 1996). They are best remembered for the UK Top 5 hits "Requiem" and "London Nights".

The duo were killed when their car was hit by a drunk driver in the Eastern Alps, Austria, on 21 January 1996. Ephraim's wife also died in the accident, leaving their three-year-old son orphaned and leaving Fuller's 10-year-old daughter without a father.

Musical career
Although they had lived near Hamburg, Germany, since 1981, the pair had actually met when they were at school in Greenwich, London, Ephraim having been born in London and Fuller in Jamaica. They were formed in 1986 as a vehicle for songwriter and record producer Ralf-René Maué. They signed with Teldec. Their musical style was a mix of soul and dance music or Eurobeat dance music. Spinning on their heads was combined with choreography, acquired during their experience as Rollerblade dancers prior to forming the duo. Dennis Fuller was a former member of the Roxy Rollers rollerskating disco act, which released a single called "I Need a Holiday" in May 1979.
	 
The duo's most notable songs were "London Nights" and "Requiem", which were initially released in 1988. "Requiem" eventually became their breakthrough single in April 1989, reaching No. 4 on the UK Singles Chart. Subsequently, the re-released "London Nights" and the album The Twelve Commandments of Dance, both peaked at No. 2 in the UK singles and album charts, respectively. Another single, "Harlem Desire", reached No. 17. A fourth single from the album, a remixed version of their 1987 release "My Love", also reached No. 46. After that, their last two UK Singles Chart entries were with "Chapel of Love" (#75) in 1990 and "Freedom" (#54) in 1991. The music videos for their singles were largely based around dance sequences and relationship/love storylines.

After this, their later recordings had little commercial success, with no further UK chart entries. However, in total, the London Boys sold 4.5 million records worldwide.

After being dropped by their record label, the band effectively split up. In 1995, shortly before their deaths, a reformed version of the group, through Polydor, made a crossover album called Hallelujah Hits, which incorporated Eurodance arrangements into traditional religious compositions.

Death
Ephraim, Fuller and Ephraim's wife all died in a car crash on 21 January 1996. They were travelling in the Austrian Alps on a mountain road on their way to a skiing holiday and along the route met a car driven by a drunk driver who was trying to pass on the opposite side of the road. The Swiss driver had reportedly been overtaking other cars in dangerous places along the road for a couple of miles beforehand, in bad weather conditions, and he hit their car head-on. Fuller, Ephraim, Ephraim's German wife Bettina, a Hamburg DJ (who was their mutual friend) and the Swiss driver all died in the accident. Ephraim and his wife left behind a son, Stevie, who was 3-years-old at the time. Fuller had a daughter, Laura, who was 10.

Discography

Albums
 The Twelve Commandments of Dance (1988/89) (#2 UK)
 Sweet Soul Music (1991) (#22 Austria)
 Love 4 Unity (1993)
 Hallelujah Hits (1995) as "New London Boys"
 The Twelve Commandments of Dance (Special Edition) (2009)

Singles

References

External links
 Discogs
 Unofficial fan biography
 Maué homepage

1959 births
1996 deaths
English dance music groups
English pop music duos
Dance-pop groups
British hi-NRG groups
Eurodisco groups
Atlantic Records artists
20th-century British musicians
Road incident deaths in Austria